Jarek Alexander Lancaster (born March 24, 1990) was an American football linebacker for the Stanford Cardinal.

High school
Lancaster attended the Sandra Day O'Connor High School in Helotes, TX, where he played defensive end, linebacker and quarterback.  He recorded 157 tackles (51 solo) and 6.5 sacks in his career and also completed 60 of 115 passing for 1,087 yards and 10 TD as a senior quarterback, where he was named All-District 28-5A second team as a senior.  He was named the Nation's 53rd best linebacker by Scout.com.  He also lettered in track and field (hurdles, Long jump, Triple jump and mile relay).

College career
Lancaster completed his career at Stanford playing in 54 straight games with 146 tackles (93 solo) and 6.5 sacks. He came to Stanford in the class of 2009 as a Safety, but was moved to Linebacker after he grew during his Red-Shirt year. His most notable season came as a sophomore in 2011, while replacing injured Shayne Skov, Lancaster started 10 games, leading the team in tackles with 70 (44 solo) for the #7 ranked Cardinal, punctuated by a 7 tackle performance in a Fiesta Bowl loss to Oklahoma State.  In his career at Stanford, Lancaster was twice named as the recipient of the Phil Moffat Award, awarded to the team's Outstanding Special Teams Player of the Year.

Personal
Jarek is the nephew of Sacha Lancaster, a former NFL Europe, CFL and AFL defensive end.

References

External links
Stanford Cardinal bio

1990 births
Living people
American football linebackers
Stanford Cardinal football players